Zacharias I (c. 722) was a ruler of the Nubian kingdom of Makuria.

Life and Reign

According to Severus of El Ashmunein, Zacharias was the son of his predecessor, Merkurios.1 Severus gives the impression that his reign was brief, for he states that "Zacharias did not choose to become king, but occupied himself with the word of God and the salvation of his soul" and appointed as king "a kinsman of his named Simon". When Simon died, Zacharias then appointed Abraham to replace him, and later deposed Abraham and replaced him with Markos.

Severus does not mention Zacharias in his account of how Kyriakos became king, so Zacharias may have died before that occasion.

Notes
 B. Evetts, History of the Patriarchs of the Coptic Church of Alexandria, Part 3 (1910)

Nubian people
Kingdom of Makuria
8th-century monarchs in Africa
8th-century births
Year of death unknown